This was the first edition of the tournament.

Robert Lindstedt and Aisam-ul-Haq Qureshi won the title after Oliver Marach and Mate Pavić retired trailing 5–7, 1–4 in the final.

Seeds

Draw

Draw

References
 Main draw

Antalya Open - Doubles
2017 Doubles